Frosini is a surname. Notable people with the surname include:

Alessandro Frosini (born 1972), Italian basketball player
Deanna Milvia Frosini (1940–2021), Italian actress and painter
Kyra Frosini (1773–1800), Greek socialite
Luciano Frosini (1927–2017), Italian racing cyclist
Pietro Frosini (1885–1951), Italian accordionist and vaudeville performer